Moreton West and Saughall Massie (previously Moreton and Saughall Massie, 1973 to 1979, and Moreton, 1979 to 2004) is a Wirral Metropolitan Borough Council ward in the Wallasey Parliamentary constituency in England.

Councillors

References

Wards of Merseyside
Politics of the Metropolitan Borough of Wirral
Wards of the Metropolitan Borough of Wirral